The 1956 Isle of Man TT was the first round of the 1956 Grand Prix motorcycle racing season. It took place between 4 June and 8 June 1956 at the Snaefell Mountain Course for the Senior and Junior TTs and the Clypse Course for the Lightweight, Ultra Lightweight and Sidecar TTs.

Senior TT (500 cc) classification

Junior TT (350 cc) classification

Lightweight TT (250 cc) classification

Ultra Lightweight TT (125 cc) classification

Sidecar TT classification

Non-championship races

Clubmans Senior TT classification

Clubmans Junior TT classification

References

External links
 Senior and Junior of the TT and Clubmans,  detailed race results
 Lightweight, and Sidecar detailed race results
 Isle of Man TT winners
 Mountain Course map

Isle of Man Tt
Tourist Trophy
Isle of Man TT
Isle of Man TT
Isle of Man TT